Princess Louise of Saxe-Meiningen may refer to:

Princess Louise of Saxe-Meiningen (1752–1805), daughter of Anton Ulrich, Duke of Saxe-Meiningen
Princess Louise of Saxe-Meiningen (1899–1985), daughter of Prince Friedrich of Saxe-Meiningen

Human name disambiguation pages